Erez Biton (born 1942 in Oran, Algeria) is an Algerian-born Israeli poet of Moroccan descent. He is the 2015 recipient of the Israel Prize for Hebrew Literature and Poetry, among other literary awards.

Biography
Erez Biton was born in Oran in a Moroccan Jewish family. His family fled Algeria in 1948, and made aliyah to Israel.  He grew up in Lod. At the age of 10, he lost his vision and his left hand to a stray hand grenade that he had found. The following year he went to school at Jerusalem's Institute for the Blind. He earned a B.A. in social work from the Hebrew University in Jerusalem and an M.A. in psychology at Bar-Ilan University. Biton is married to Rachel Calahorra Biton and the couple have two children.

Career
Following his studies, Biton worked as a social worker in Ashkelon for seven years and as a psychologist in an outlying town. He worked as a journalist and published a weekly column in the Israeli mainstream daily Maariv. His first book, Mincha Marokait (Moroccan Gift), published in 1976, established him as the founding father of Mizrahi poetry in Israel.

Published works

Poetry
Mincha Maroka'it "Moroccan Gift," Eked, 1976
Sefer Hana'na "The Book of Mint," Eked, 1979
Tsipor bein Yabashot "Intercontinental Bird", 1990
Timbisert, Tsipor Maroka'it, "Timbisert, a Moroccan Bird", Hakibbutz Hameuchad, 2009
Nofim Khavushei Einayim "Blindfolded Landscapes", Hakibbutz Hameuchad, 2013
Bet Hapsanterim (Hebrew: בית הפסנתרים) "The House of Pianos", Hakibbutz Hameuchad, 2015

Drama
Sulika "Soulika", Snir, 2005

Awards and recognition
(2015) Biton was awarded the Israel Prize for Literature, the first Mizrahi Jew to receive it. The prize committee described his poems as being "the epitome of courageous dealings, sensitive and deep with a wide range of personal and collective experiences centered around the pain of migration, planting roots in the country, and the reestablishment of the Mizrahi identity as an integral part of the overall Israeli portrait.” 
(2014) Bialik Prize for Lifetime Achievement
(2014) Yehuda Amichai Prize
(1988) Prime Minister's Prize
(1982) Miriam Talpir Prize

See also
Israeli literature

References

External links
Biography and bibliography at the Institute for the Translation of Hebrew Literature
 Encyclopedia of Jews in the Islamic World, by Stanley Nash, p 6 sq

Israeli poets
Israeli columnists
Israeli social workers
1942 births
Living people
Bar-Ilan University alumni
Paul Baerwald School of Social Work and Social Welfare alumni
Algerian people of Moroccan-Jewish descent
Algerian emigrants to Israel
Israeli blind people
Israel Prize in Hebrew poetry recipients